Middle East Eye (MEE) is a London-based news website covering events in the Middle East and North Africa. MEE describes itself as an "independently funded online news organization that was founded in April 2014." MEE seeks to be the primary portal of Middle East news, and describes its target audience as "all those communities of readers living in and around the region that care deeply for its fate".

Organisation
MEE is edited by David Hearst, a former foreign leader writer for the British daily, The Guardian. MEE is owned by Middle East Eye Ltd, a UK company incorporated in 2013 under the sole name of Jamal Awn Jamal Bessasso. It employs about 20 full-time staff in its London office.

MEE has been accused of being backed by Qatar. The governments of Saudi Arabia, UAE, Egypt and Bahrain accuse MEE of pro-Muslim Brotherhood bias and receiving Qatari funding. As a consequence, they demanded MEE to be shut down following the Saudi-led blockade of Qatar. MEE has denied the accusations, saying that they are independent of any government or movement and are not funded by Qatar.

On 20 October 2022, MEE cut ties with Palestinian journalist Shatha Hammad after it was discovered that she made a Facebook post in 2014 which praised Adolf Hitler for "sharing the same ideology" and the Holocaust. The Thomson Reuters Foundation had withdrawn a 2022 Kurt Schork Award in International Journalism from her, after the discovery, on 18 October.

Coverage
Middle East Eye covers a range of topics across the Middle East. According to its website, it reports on events in 22 different countries. Content is separated into different categories on its website including news, opinion and essays.

Since the foundation of the media outlet, it has provided exclusives on a number of major events in the Middle East, which have often been picked up by other media outlets globally. In early June 2017, an anonymous hacker group began distributing emails to multiple news outlets that they had hacked from the inbox of Yousef Otaiba, the UAE's ambassador in Washington D.C. This included providing details from leaked emails of Mohammed bin Salman and US officials. This revelation on 14 August 2017, led to other media outlets to print other material from the leaked emails. According to The New York Times, the hacked emails appeared to benefit Qatar and be the work of hackers working for Qatar, a common subject of the distributed emails.

On July 29, 2016, MEE published a story alleging that the government of the United Arab Emirates, aided by Palestinian exile Mohammed Dahlan, had funnelled significant sums of money to conspirators of the 2016 Turkish coup d'état attempt two weeks earlier. In 2017, Dahlan brought a lawsuit of libel against the MEE in a London court seeking damages of up to £250,000. However, Dahlan abandoned the suit shortly before the case was to begin. In a statement, Dahlan maintained that the story was "fully fabricated" but claimed that he has "achieved his goals in the English courts," and was now planning to sue Facebook in Dublin where the article was "widely published". However, according to MEE and their lawyers, by dropping the claim, Dahlan would be forced to pay all the legal costs, of both parties, estimated to be in excess of £500,000.

In November 2019, the Turkish government officially accused Dahlan of involvement in the 2016 Turkish coup d'état attempt and is offering $700,000 for information leading to his capture.

Criticism of coverage
Saudi Arabia accused MEE of being a news outlet funded by Qatar (both directly and indirectly).

On 22 June 2017, during the Qatar diplomatic crisis, Saudi Arabia, the United Arab Emirates (UAE), Egypt, and Bahrain, as part of a list of 13 demands, demanded that Qatar close Middle East Eye, which they saw as sympathetic to the Muslim Brotherhood and a Qatari-funded and aligned outlet. Middle East Eye denied it has ever received Qatari funds.

Notable contributors

 Alistair Burt – British MP
 Ian Cobain – Senior Reporter for MEE
 Jonathan Cook – Journalist, Nazareth  
 Ahmet Davutoglu – Former Prime Minister of Turkey
 Richard A. Falk – Professor Emeritus of International Law at Princeton University 
 Daniel Kawczynski – British MP
 Faisal Kutty – Canadian lawyer, law professor at Barry University and Osgoode Hall Law School and human rights activist
 Ali Lmrabet – Moroccan journalist, El Mundo
 Gideon Levy – Haaretz columnist
 Moncef Marzouki – former president of Tunisia
Joseph Massad  – professor, Columbia University
 Peter Oborne – former  Daily Mail and Daily Telegraph columnist
 Madawi al-Rasheed – visiting professor at the Middle East Institute of the London School of Economics
 Sarah Leah Whitson – Human Rights Watch

Jamal Khashoggi 
Jamal Khashoggi wrote for MEE prior to joining The Washington Post.

According to a post on the MEE website, Khashoggi wrote for them over a period of two years. According to MEE, his op-eds were not credited to him at the time due to concerns for his safety because many of his articles for MEE are critical of Saudi Arabia and its policies, and Saudi Arabia's rift with Qatar. Khashoggi, a Washington Post columnist, was assassinated when he entered the Saudi consulate in Turkey on 2 October 2018. After initial denials, Saudi Arabia stated that he was killed by rogue assassins inside the consulate building with "premeditated intention".

Middle East tensions

Blocking

In 2016, the United Arab Emirates blocked the Middle East Eye in what was a countrywide ban. MEE says it contacted the UAE embassy in London for an explanation, but never received a response. Saudi Arabia also blocked the website across the country in May 2017. Following protests against the President Abdel Fattah el-Sisi in September and October 2019, Egypt also blocked the website.

2017–2018 Qatar diplomatic crisis
In June 2017, Saudi Arabia, UAE, Egypt and Bahrain ended their diplomatic relationships with Qatar, followed by a list of 13 demands to restore diplomatic relations. MEE was mentioned in one of the demands to be shut down by Qatar even though the news organisation denies receiving funds from them stating that 'the demand as an attempt to "extinguish any free voice which dares to question what they are doing." In a statement responding to the demand, the publication's editor-in-chief said "MEE covers the area without fear or favour, and we have carried reports critical of the Qatari authorities, for instance how workers from the subcontinent are treated on building projects for the 2022 World Cup."

Cyberattack 
In April 2020, MEE was one of 20 websites targeted by hackers that cybersecurity experts, ESET, have linked to an Israeli surveillance company called Candiru. The website was impacted using a Watering hole attack which serves malicious code to certain visitors allowing the attackers to compromise their PCs.

References

External links

Official website

2014 establishments in the United Kingdom
Publications established in 2014
Mass media in London
Mass media in the Middle East
Muslim Brotherhood